Maurice Richard 'Mocha' Johnson (15 January 1907 – 30 May 2000) was an Australian rules footballer who played for Carlton and South Melbourne in the Victorian Football League.

Johnson made his debut for the Carlton Football Club in Round 5 of the 1927 season. He had a falling-out with coach Frank Maher after six rounds of the 1936 season, which resulted in him leaving Carlton to join South Melbourne. In 1938, Johnson captain-coached Launceston to both the NTFA and Tasmanian State Premierships.

Johnson died in May 2000.

References

External links

Australian rules footballers from Melbourne
Carlton Football Club players
Sydney Swans players
Brunswick Football Club players
Launceston Football Club players
Launceston Football Club coaches
1907 births
2000 deaths
People from Brunswick, Victoria